Carlos López Estrada (born September 12, 1988) is a Mexican-American Academy Award-nominated filmmaker, music video director, commercial director, theatre director, and actor. Born in Mexico, he moved to the United States when he was 12 and later enrolled at Chapman University.

He made his feature film directorial debut in 2018 with Blindspotting, which premiered opening night at Sundance 2018 and was subsequently released by Lionsgate Entertainment. His second film, Summertime, premiered opening night of Sundance 2020 and was released in July 2021. Carlos' third film, Raya and the Last Dragon, was released by Disney in March 2021 and was nominated for an Academy Award for Best Animated Feature at the 94th Academy Awards. Estrada and actress Kelly Marie Tran announced that they were establishing a new production company called Antigravity Academy in November 2022, intending to help produce entertainment from and about people from historically excluded communities.

Film
López Estrada directed a short film titled Identity Theft based on a one-act play written by Andrew Rothschild. It stars stage veterans Bill Irwin and Kate Burton. The film premiered at the 2015 Palm Springs International Festival of Short Films.

López Estrada directed his first feature film in 2017, Blindspotting, starring  Daveed Diggs and Rafael Casal. The film, released in 2018, is semi-autobiographical and based on Diggs and Casal's lives in a rapidly gentrifying Oakland.

In October 2019, Walt Disney Animation Studios announced that they were developing a feature film with López Estrada. López Estrada was also set to direct a live-action/CGI remake of Disney's Robin Hood. López Estrada was confirmed to direct Raya and the Last Dragon with Don Hall. López Estrada left Disney in early 2022. In July 2022, López Estrada joined Nexus Studios.

On October 31, 2022, López Estrada was announced to be the writer and director of the live-action adaptation of Your Name for Paramount Pictures and Bad Robot Productions, replacing Marc Webb and Lee Isaac Chung.

Music videos
López Estrada has directed videos for a variety of artists, including clipping., Thundercat, Flying Lotus, Hook n Sling, Goo Goo Dolls, Reptar, Passion Pit, El Sportivo & The Blooz, MYPET, Saint Motel, Maximum Balloon, Bowerbirds, Capital Cities and many more.

In 2011, López Estrada directed a music video for Mexican pop band Jesse & Joy of their song "Me Voy." The video, which uses stop motion and found the production team trimming 2900 photographs in order to create the sequences included, earned the title of Best Short Form Music Video at the 13th Annual Latin Grammy Awards in 2012. López Estrada also directed "Chocolate" from Electricidad for Jesse & Joy.

In 2013, López Estrada co-directed a music video for Capital Cities’ "Kangaroo Court" which features American actor Darren Criss and American actress Shannon Woodward.

López Estrada directed five videos for the experimental rap group clipping.’s major label debut titled CLPPNG. López Estrada came in contact with clipping. after befriending Jonathan Snipes, a member of the trio that makes up clipping., while López Estrada was in film school. “Work Work” was the first single from the album. Stereogum detailed López Estrada's work on the videos as being, “[An] inventive, memorable, and weirdly unsettling experience." This work led to many collaborations with rapper Daveed Diggs, a member of clipping.

In 2015, López Estrada directed a video for Thundercat's "Them Changes", which featured artists Flying Lotus and Kamasi Washington. The song is a part of Thundercat's The Beyond / Where the Giants Roam, which was his first collection of solo material in two years and placed the artist in collaboration with various others, such as Flying Lotus and Kamasi Washington, who each contributed keyboard and saxophone, respectively.

In 2018, López Estrada directed the music video for Billie Eilish's "When the Party's Over".

In 2021, López Estrada directed the music video for Katy Perry's "Electric" song in collaboration with the Pokémon franchise for its 25th anniversary.

Television
In 2018, López Estrada directed the second episode of the final season of Legion, titled "Chapter 21". The episode was released in July 2019.

Theatre
In October 2015, López Estrada starred in an original multimedia theatre show, titled Ded!. based on the Mexican Day of the Dead tradition, which he created and co-directed with Cristina Bercovitz. He and Bercovitz had previously worked together as co-directors on the music video for clipping.’s “GET UP.” The show ran at the Matrix Theatre in Los Angeles and was composed of an ensemble of musicians, actors and puppeteers. The show also featured a guest performance by Bill Irwin. Living Out Loud, Los Angeles praised López Estrada's pantomime and comedic performance in the show.

López Estrada directed a taping of #BARS, a live musical theatre and rap medley workshop in New York City, springing from the culmination of a six-week seminar by Rafael Casal, a poet, writer, rapper and co-creator of #BARS. The film features performances by a variety of artists, including Rafael Casal, rapper Daveed Diggs, poet Sarah Kay and nine more performers from New York City.

Filmography

Feature films

Television

References

External links

1988 births
Living people
Latin Grammy Award winners
American people of Mexican descent
Walt Disney Animation Studios people
Mexican music video directors
American music video directors